In organic chemistry, propyl is a three-carbon alkyl substituent with chemical formula  for the linear form. This substituent form is obtained by removing one hydrogen atom attached to the terminal carbon of propane. A propyl substituent is often represented in organic chemistry with the symbol Pr (not to  be confused with the element praseodymium).

An isomeric form of propyl is obtained by moving the point of attachment from a terminal carbon atom to the central carbon atom, named 1-methylethyl or isopropyl.

Linear propyl is sometimes termed normal and hence written with a prefix n- (i.e., n-propyl), as the absence of the prefix n- does not indicate which attachment point is chosen, i.e. absence of prefix does not automatically exclude the possibility of it being the branched version (i.e. i-propyl or isopropyl).
In addition, there is a third, cyclic, form called cyclopropyl, or c-propyl. It is not isomeric with the other two forms, having a different chemical formula ( vs ), not just a different connectivity of the atoms.

Examples
n-Propyl acetate is an ester which has the n-propyl group attached to the oxygen atom of the acetate group.

Other examples 
 Isopropyl alcohol

References

Alkyl groups